Graduale simplex ("Simple Gradual") is a gradual in Latin and in Gregorian chant, published by the Vatican in 1967 following the Second Vatican Council, so that the use of Gregorian chant can adapt to smaller parishes and churches or to those who lack experienced choirs.

Its full title is Graduale simplex in usum minorum ecclesiarum (simple gradual for the use of small churches).

Constitution on liturgy 

The publication of the first edition of the Graduale simplex was achieved in 1967, as a reworking of the Gregorian chant book in order to satisfy the Sacrosanctum Concilium Constitution of 4 December 1963, following the Second Vatican Council.

History 
There have been two editions of the Graduale Simplex : the first was published by the Holy See in 1967. The second, revised and definitive edition, was published in 1975 and has been re-printed since then.

The Graduale simplex in its definitive edition includes the Kyriale simplex, as well as some famous hymns: Te Deum, Veni Creator, Te decet laus, etc.

Editions 
 Graduale simplex in usum minorum ecclesiarum, 1st edition, Vatican 1967.
 Graduale simplex in usum minorum ecclesiarum, 2nd edition, Libreria editrice Vaticana, Vatican 1975,  515 p.

External links 

 Graduale simplex, published by Solesmes Editions
 Graduale Simplex.

References 

Roman Rite liturgical books
Catholic liturgical music
Mass in the Catholic Church